Podolie is a village and municipality in Nové Mesto nad Váhom District in the Trenčín Region of western Slovakia.

History
In historical records the village was first mentioned in 1332.

Geography
The municipality lies at an altitude of 180 metres and covers an area of 17.266 km2. It has a population of about 2056 people.

Miniature park 
Podolie is the site of Park miniatúr, a miniature park.

References

External links

  Official page
http://www.statistics.sk/mosmis/eng/run.html

Villages and municipalities in Nové Mesto nad Váhom District